Handball Club Zubří or HC ROBE Zubří is a Czech handball club based in Zubří, Czech Republic.

History 
The club was founded in 1926. In 1957 Hc Zubří played the first international match, lost 15:17 against ASK Vorwärts Berlin. Club advanced to the second league in 1958 and in 1960 Czech Handball Extraliga. Club played in the EHF Champions league and EHF Cup in 1995, 1996, and 1997. The club plays its domestic matches in the 1,200-seat ROBE Arena, which traditionally creates an excellent spectator atmosphere with high attendance.

Crest, colours, supporters

Club crest

Kit manufacturers

Kits

Sports Hall information

Name: – ROBE Aréna
City: – Zubří
Capacity: – 1200
Address: – Hlavní 492, 756 54 Zubří, Czech Republic

Management

Team

Current squad 

Squad for the 2022–23 season

Technical staff
 Head Coach:  Peter Dávid
 Fitness Coach:  Jakub Bambuch
 Physiotherapist:  Peter Pecho
 Physiotherapist:  Denisa Pechová
 Masseur:  Petr Kocurek

Transfers

Transfers for the 2022–23 season

Joining 
  Kristián Galia (LP) from  HCB Karviná

Leaving 
  Šimon Mizera (GK) to  Elverum Håndball
  Milan Malina (GK) to  Klub házené Vsetín
  Josef Dobeš (LW) to  Házená Velká Bystřice
  Antonín Vodička (CB) to  Házená Velká Bystřice
  Jiří Dokoupil (LP) to  HC Dukla Prague
  Ivan Jirák (LP) to  HC Zlín
  Štěpán Fiala (LP) to  SHC Maloměřice Brno

Previous squads

Accomplishments 

Czech Handball Extraliga:
 3 x  – 1995/96, 1996/97, 2011/12
 6 x  – 1994/95, 2005/06, 2006/07, 2007/08, 2008/09, 2009/10
 6 x  – 1997/98, 2000/01, 2010/11, 2016/17, 2017/18, 2021/22

Winner of the Czech Handball cup:
 2 x  – 1996/1997, 2008/2009

European Records

EHF ranking

Former club members

Notable former players

  Tomáš Číp (2006–2011)
  Richard Hladký (1997–2001)
  Jakub Hrstka (2006–2011)
  Miroslav Jurka (2004–2013, 2019–)
  Michal Kasal (2009–2012)
  Stanislav Kašpárek (2011–2015)
  Jakub Krupa (2002–2008, 2021–)
  Pavel Mičkal (2001–2005)
  Tomáš Řezníček (2002–2005, 2014–2016, 2019–2020)
  Peter Šlachta (2011–2017)
  Štěpán Zeman (2016–2019)

Former coaches

References

External links
 
 

Czech handball clubs
Handball clubs established in 1926
1926 establishments in Czechoslovakia
Vsetín District